Overground Music is the debut 1990 album (not counting the cassette-only albums released the previous year) from the Hungarian musical ensemble After Crying. It is sung in English, as opposed to their following albums (until 6), that featured lyrics in Hungarian.

Track listing

Personnel
Csaba Vedres - piano, lead vocals (1,3,5,6), vocals and synthesizer
Péter Pejtsik - cello, lead vocals (2,4) and vocals

Additional personnel:
Kristóf Fogolyán - flute
Zsolt Maroevich - viola
Judit Andrejski - lead vocals (8) and vocals
Pál Makovecz - trombone (2,5,6,8)
Otto Rácz- oboe (1,5,8)
Aladár Tüske - bassoon (1,5,6,8)
Balázs Winkler - trumpet (1,2,5,6,8)

Notes 

1990 debut albums
After Crying albums